The Johannes Miller House is a Registered Historic Place in the Orange County, New York, Town of Montgomery. It is located on NY 211 just opposite its junction with NY 416 and another Registered Historic Place, the Harrison Meeting House Site and Cemetery. Orange County Airport is nearby.

It was built originally as a Georgian in 1771 by Hans Smith, one of the early German settlers of the town. Twenty years later, Miller, a prosperous local businessman, acquired it and rebuilt it in the Federal style. In 1835, his descendants added some Greek Revival elements.

References

Houses on the National Register of Historic Places in New York (state)
Houses in Orange County, New York
National Register of Historic Places in Orange County, New York
Houses completed in 1771
Federal architecture in New York (state)